Cláudio Wanderley Sarmento Neto (born 3 November 1982 in Maceió-AL, Brazil) known as Claudinho or Dinho is a Brazilian football (soccer) player who has recently played for South Korea's K-League 2009 side Gyeongnam FC.

Claudinho has played for Corinthians Alagoano in the Copa do Brasil.

References

External links
 

1982 births
Living people
Brazilian footballers
Brazilian expatriate footballers
Gyeongnam FC players
K League 1 players
Expatriate footballers in South Korea
Association football midfielders